Paul Lewis Maloney (born December 15, 1949) is a United States district judge of the United States District Court for the Western District of Michigan.

Education and career

Born in Cleveland, Ohio, Maloney received a Bachelor of Arts degree from Lehigh University in 1972 and a Juris Doctor from the University of Detroit School of Law in 1975. He was an Assistant prosecutor, Berrien County Prosecutor's Office, Michigan from 1975 to 1981. He was a Prosecuting attorney of that office, from 1981 to 1989. He was a Deputy assistant attorney general of Criminal Division, U.S. Department of Justice from 1989 to 1993. He was a Special assistant to the director, State of Michigan Department of Corrections from 1993 to 1995. He was a District judge, Berrien County Trial Court from 1995 to 1996. He was a Circuit judge, Berrien County Trial Court from 1996 to 2007.

Federal judicial service

Maloney is a United States District Judge of the United States District Court for the Western District of Michigan. Maloney was nominated by President George W. Bush on March 19, 2007, to a seat vacated by Richard Alan Enslen. He was confirmed by the United States Senate on July 9, 2007, and received his commission on July 13, 2007. He served as chief judge from 2008 to 2015.

References

Sources

1949 births
Living people
Michigan state court judges
Judges of the United States District Court for the Western District of Michigan
United States district court judges appointed by George W. Bush
21st-century American judges
Lawyers from Cleveland
Lehigh University alumni
University of Detroit Mercy alumni